Karin Pereira de Souza (born 7 February 1979) is a Brazilian actress, singer and songwriter. In 2002, she won the talent show Popstars and joined the Brazilian girl group Rouge until 2005, with which she released four studio albums, Rouge (2002), C'est La Vie (2003), Blá Blá Blá (2004) and Mil e Uma Noites (2005), selling in all 6 million copies and becoming the most successful girl group of Brazil and one of the twenty that more sold in the world.

It gained prominence like actress when starring several musicals in the theater, like In 2009 Hairspray, Emoções Baratas, Alô, Dolly!, Xanadu and Mudança de Hábito, besides starring in the serials television Pé na Cova and Sexo e Negas. In 2016, returns to the SBT to integrate the cast of the telenovela Carinha de Anjo, interpreting fun and confused nun, Sister Fabiana.

Career

2002–06: Rouge
In 2002 Karin enrolled in the talent show Popstars, being selected from 30 thousand enrolled for the second phase of the program, where more than 6 thousand were classified in the Anhembi Sambadrome, São Paulo, where they performed song evaluation. In the following phases, the jurors became more and more demanding, in this way, selecting for the next stages only the girls who really were able to face the career of popstar. After 5 qualifying rounds, only 8 girls were classified for the final stage that took place at the home of the Popstars. After the 6th and final eliminatory phase, the Brazilian girl group was finally formed by Fantine Thó, Li Martins, Luciana Andrade, Aline Wirley and Karin. In the same year was released the first studio album, the homonym Rouge, reaching the first position and selling around 2 million copies, receiving the certificate of diamond by Brazilian Association of Record Producers (ABPD). His Lead single was "Não Dá para Resistir" followed by "Ragatanga", track with special participation of Spanish girl group Las Ketchup, in addition to "Beijo Molhado" and "Nunca Deixe de Sonhar." Also the group released the remix album titled Rouge Remixes, selling 150 thousand copies, receiving certificate of gold, and the video album O Sonho de Ser Uma Popstar, bringing its first show.

In 2003 the group released the second studio album, C'est La Vie, selling around 100,000 copies in the first week of release and around 1 million copies in total, bringing as singles "Brilha La Luna", "Um Anjo Veio Me Falar" and "Vem Cair na Zueira". On 3 December is released the second record of concerts of the group on DVD, titled A Festa dos Seus Sonhos. On 11 February 2004 Luciana announced that she was leaving the group, claiming the lack of identification with the most dance-pop sound that the group was taking. After the departure of Luciana, the four remaining members continued and released the albums Blá Blá Blá (2004) and Mil e Uma Noites (2005). The group split definitively in June 2006, when the contract with Sony Music expired and was not renewed. Over four years, the group sold about 6 million records, becoming the most successful female group in Brazil and one of the twenty that more sold in the world, and received in all, two gold certification, two platinum certification, one double platinum certification and one diamond certification by ABPD.

2006–present: Career as an actress
Between 2006 and 2008 Karin tried to present for some record companies a project for an album, not obtaining success in obtaining a contract. In 2008 it became backing vocal of the rapper Tulio Dek, also recording the vocals of support in its studio album O Que Se Leva da Vida É a Vida Que Se Leva. In 2009 the producer Rick Bonadio began to work with her in its debut album, that would be released by Midas Music and focused in the R&B, bringing also the participation of some rappers. The album ended up never being released and no band released, giving no reasons for the happened thing. In the same year, focusing on the career of actress, made its debut in the musical theatre in the musical Hairspray, also happening in 2010 by the reassembly of Emoções Baratas. In the same year it gained prominence as the personage Dionne in Hair. After meeting Miguel Falabella behind the scenes of the shows, he was invited by him to join the telenovela Aquele Beijo in 2011, making her debut on television. In 2012 it was the turn to give life to Ensemble, the musical Alô, Dolly! and, soon after, Thalia of the classic Xanadu. In 2013 joined the cast of the series television Pé na Cova, Rede Globo, playing Soninja in the first three seasons.

In 2014 Karin left the cast temporarily to dedicate to the other work in the transmitter, being explained in the series that its personage had entered an aesthetic clinic and mysteriously disappeared. The project in question was Sexo e as Negas, inspired by the American Sex and the City, but it is based on the periphery and exclusively with black actresses. In 2015, after six years of theater career, he finally received the chance to play her first protagonist, the character Deloris Van Cartier, Mudança de Hábito, performed in theaters by Whoopi Goldberg and on the American stage by Raven-Symoné. In 2016 returns to the fifth season of Pé na Cova. Soon after it signs contract with the SBT to integrate the soap opera Carinha de Anjo, interpreting Sister Fabiana.

Filmography

Films

Theatre appearances

Discography

Other appearances

References

External links 

1979 births
Living people
People from Rio de Janeiro (state)
Afro-Brazilian women singer-songwriters
Afro-Brazilian women singers
Afro-Brazilian singer-songwriters
Brazilian women singer-songwriters
Brazilian women pop singers
Brazilian contemporary R&B singers
Brazilian female dancers
Afro-Brazilian female dancers
Afro-Brazilian actresses
20th-century Brazilian LGBT people
21st-century Brazilian LGBT people
Bisexual actresses
Bisexual singers
Bisexual songwriters
Bisexual women
Brazilian bisexual people
Brazilian LGBT singers
Brazilian LGBT songwriters
Brazilian television actresses
Brazilian telenovela actresses
Brazilian musical theatre actresses
Brazilian stage actresses
Feminist musicians
Rouge (group) members
Popstars winners
21st-century Brazilian women singers
21st-century Brazilian actresses